The 1958 Georgia gubernatorial election was held on November 4, 1958.

Lieutenant Governor Ernest Vandiver won the Democratic primary on September 10 with 80.51% of the vote and 400 out of 410 county unit votes. At this time, Georgia was a one-party state, and the Democratic nomination was tantamount to victory. Vandiver won the November general election without an opponent.

Democratic primary

County unit system
From 1917 until 1962, the Democratic Party in the U.S. state of Georgia used a voting system called the county unit system to determine victors in statewide primary elections.

The system was ostensibly designed to function similarly to the Electoral College, but in practice the large ratio of unit votes for small, rural counties to unit votes for more populous urban areas provided outsized political influence to the smaller counties.

Under the county unit system, the 159 counties in Georgia were divided by population into three categories. The largest eight counties were classified as "Urban", the next-largest 30 counties were classified as "Town", and the remaining 121 counties were classified as "Rural". Urban counties were given 6 unit votes, Town counties were given 4 unit votes, and Rural counties were given 2 unit votes, for a total of 410 available unit votes. Each county's unit votes were awarded on a winner-take-all basis.

Candidates were required to obtain a majority of unit votes (not necessarily a majority of the popular vote), or 206 total unit votes, to win the election. If no candidate received a majority in the initial primary, a runoff election was held between the top two candidates to determine a winner.

Candidates
Lee Roy Abernathy, Southern gospel singer
William T. Bodenhamer, Baptist preacher and state legislator from Ty Ty
Ernest Vandiver, Lieutenant Governor of Georgia

Campaign
Bodenhamer ran a "biblical segregationist" campaign  aligned with incumbent Governor Marvin Griffin, whom Vandiver had alienated during their term together. He opened his campaign by showing pictures of Vandiver between two Negro politicians and said, "Birds of a feather flock together." He accused Vandiver of being "the candidate of the NAACP." Vandiver responded by promising that "no, not one" black would be admitted to Georgia's white schools.

Lee Roy Abernathy, a gospel singer from Canton who frequently appeared on Atlanta television, also ran on a platform promising to diminish the powers of the governor and make monthly television reports to the people of Georgia.

Results

In the decisive county unit count, Vandiver won 400 out of 410 votes, with Bodenhamer winning the remaining ten. This was the last primary election held under the county unit rule, which was ruled unconstitutional by the Supreme Court of the United States in Gray v. Sanders.

General election results

References

1958
Gubernatorial
Georgia
November 1958 events in the United States